Glorious Ruins is the 22nd live worship album by Hillsong Church. It was recorded live in London, England, and Sydney, Australia by the Hillsong Worship team from around the world including Reuben Morgan, Joel Houston, Ben Fielding, Hillsong United, and international teams from London, Stockholm, and Cape Town. The album includes 12 songs including "Man of Sorrows", "Glorious Ruins", "Christ Is Enough", "Anchor", and "You Crown the Year". It was released on 28 June 2013 in Australia and New Zealand and on 2 July 2013 internationally. The album reached No. 3 on the ARIA Albums Chart.

Background 

On 27 and 28 October 2012, Hillsong Live recorded the first part at the Hillsong Convention Centre in Sydney with a worship night called "This Is for Everyone". The second part of the album was recorded by Hillsong London at London's Dominion Theatre on 17 February 2013. "Man of Sorrows", the first single from the album, was released as a free download just before Easter.

Hillsong Live announced the new album by releasing its cover artwork 3 April 2013. A trailer for the album and the live video for "Man of Sorrows" was released on 4 June 2013. The album was officially released on 2 July 2013.

Vision and inspiration 

"Let the ruins come to life | In the beauty of Your Name | Rising up from the ashes | God forever You reign"

This chorus of the title track, Glorious Ruins, was an underlying theme through the life of Hillsong Church in the lead up to the Hillsong Live praise & worship album recording, Glorious Ruins.  It’s a vivid image which captures the imagination and stirs the soul.  Brian Houston, Senior Pastor of Hillsong Church explains, “Ruins can speak of crushing defeat or perhaps of something abandoned, but the good news today is that the ruins come to life.  …Through Jesus Christ what we look at is ruins that become glorious..." Whether it be through times of personal devotion or in your church, we pray that the lyrics contained in this album stir your faith & love in Jesus Christ.

Track listing

Personnel 

Worship leaders
 Juliet Adekambi
 Jay Cook
 Matt Crocker
 Jonathan 'JD' Douglass
 Ben Fielding
 Annie Garratt
 Jad Gillies
 Joel Houston
 Reuben Morgan
 Laura Toganivalu
 David Ware

Vocals
 Nina Mityuk
 Sam Evans
 Cassey Zschech
 Dan Barrett
 Ashley John Baptiste
 Jill Marie Cooper
 Jenny Deacon
 Katie Dodson
 Hannah Hobbs
 Jorim Kelly
 Ingrid Kennedy
 Brad Kohring
 Ana Loback
 Collena Masuku
 Nait Masuku
 Sheila Mpofu
 Alexander Pappas
 Dean Ussher
 Esther Volstad
 Kevin Curiel
 Marcus Temu

Music directors
 Chris Davenport
 Gio Galanti
 Autumn Hardman
 Nigel Hendroff

Electric guitars
 Ben Fielding
 Chris Davenport
 Nigel Hendroff
 Joel Hingston
 David Kennedy
 Timon Klein
 Dave Marinelli
 Isaac Soon
 Dylan Thomas
 Jad Gillies

Acoustic guitars
 Tyler Braland
 Matt Crocker
 Ben Fielding
 Joel Houston
 Kevin Curiel
 Reuben Morgan
 Herny Seely
 Brian 'BJ' Phodham

Keys
 David Andrew
 Moses Byun
 Adam Dodson
 Gio Galanti
 Dave George
 Autumn Hardman
 Peter James
 Matt Hann
 Thiago Pereira
 Ryan Taubert
 Ben Tennikoff

Bass
 Ike Graham
 Matt Hann
 Ntando 'Bob' Mpofu
 Jihea Oh

Drums
 Daniel McMurray
 Harrison Wood
 Simon Kobler
 Brendan Tan

Percussion
 Bede Benjamin-Korporaal
 Hristo Dushev
 JP Starra

Trombone
 Marc Warry

French Horn
 Elizabeth Gorringe

Violin
 Evie Gallardo

Cello
 Michaeli Witney

source:

Reception 

Before its release, the album received positive reviews from Louder Than the Music's Jono Davies, who wrote, "there aren't many Christian bands that make the world stop and listen when they release a new album, but Hillsong are one of them." And describes the album's sound as "is this album much of the same classic Hillsong sound, or a new fresh style of worship? Well, a bit of both to be honest, but more on that later." And ends saying "How do you sum up an album like this? I don't know if words are enough. People will love this album simply because it's another classic from Hillsong, who seem to be getting better and better with each release. The band have been more creative in the last few years, which must be commended. I actually think the songs on this album are stronger than previous albums. If some albums in the past worked well as a package, this album has much stronger songs that can stand on their own in times of worship." The album received three four-and-a-half-star-out-of-five ratings.

Charts

Weekly charts

Year-end charts

References 

Hillsong Music live albums
2013 live albums